This is a list of mayors of the city of Sion, Valais, Switzerland. The executive of the city of Sion is its Conseil municipal or Conseil exécutif. Its presiding member is the Président de la Ville de Sion.

Sion
 
Sion, Switzerland
Lists of mayors (complete 1900-2013)